Star One D1 is a communications satellite operated by Embratel Star One with headquarters in Rio de Janeiro, Brazil. It was built by Space Systems/Loral (SSL) based on the SSL 1300 satellite bus. The satellite was successfully launched into space on 21 December 2016 at 20:30 UTC with an Ariane 5 ECA launch vehicle from the Centre Spatial Guyanais in French Guiana, together with the JCSAT-15.

Coverage 
Star One D1 is equipped with 28 C-band transponders, 24 Ku-band transponders, and 18 Ka-Band transponders to meet the data, audio, video, and Internet demands of corporate and enterprise customers in Brazil, and Latin America.

In addition, the Star One D1 satellite is capable of being used by large companies and government institutions. The satellite is capable of receiving and transmitting television, radio, telephony, internet, and other data signals for entertainment, telemedicine, tele-education and business applications, necessary for the interconnection of the Latin Americans countries and essential for the most distant communities.

See also 

 Star One (satellite operator)
 Star One C2
 Star One C3
 Star One C12

References

External links 
 Embratel 
 Satbeams

Star One satellites
Spacecraft launched in 2016
2016 in Brazil